Norman Allan Smith (born 25 March 1929), known as Allan Smith, is a Sri Lankan diver. He competed in the men's 3 metre springboard event at the 1952 Summer Olympics.

References

External links
 

1929 births
Living people
Sri Lankan male divers
Olympic divers of Sri Lanka
Divers at the 1952 Summer Olympics
Place of birth missing (living people)